FC Hard is an Austrian football club located in Hard, a town in the country’s westernmost state of Vorarlberg. They currently play in the Vorarlbergliga, the 4th tier of Austrian football.

History
The club was formed in 1922 as SpVgg Hard. The name was changed to FC Hard in 1947. The club played in the fourth tier Vorarlbergliga for most of its history. Since winning that league in 1989, the team has competed in the Austrian Regional League West.

Stadium
FC Hard play their home matches in Waldstadion Hard, which is located in the north of the town near Lake Constance. The current capacity is 2550, of which 750 is covered seating. The average attendance for the 2010–11 season was 407.

Achievements
 Austrian Regional League (West) (III):
 Winners (1): 2002
 Runners Up (4): 1992, 1994, 1995, 2007
 Vorarlbergliga State League (IV):
 Winners (2): 1978, 1989
 Runners Up (4): 1985, 1986, 1987, 1988

See also
 Football in Austria
 Austrian Regional League West

References

External links
  – Official website
  – Facebook page

Hard
Association football clubs established in 1922
1922 establishments in Austria